Guy (II) of Dramelay (died 1285/86) was the third Baron of Chalandritsa in the Principality of Achaea in Frankish Greece, and also bailli of the Principality in 1282–85.

Life 
Guy was a scion of the Dramelay (or Trimolay, Tremolay) family from the namesake village in Burgundy, who had held the Barony of Chalandritsa since 1209, when a "G. of Dramelay" (possibly "Guy", in which case this would be Guy I) is attested among the signatories of the Treaty of Sapienza. Many older histories, following Jean Alexandre Buchon and Karl Hopf, have Audebert de la Trémouille as the first baron. His successor, Robert, is attested ca. 1230. It was he who built the castle of Chalandritsa, according to the Greek and Italian versions of the Chronicle of the Morea. He was in turn succeeded by his son Guy (II). The Aragonese version of the Chronicle on the other hand reports a completely different story, according to which the castle of Chalandritsa had been built by Conrad of Aleman, Baron of Patras, and that it and other lands, comprising eight knight's fiefs, were purchased around 1259 by Prince William II of Villehardouin and given to a knight named Guy of Dramelay, who had only recently arrived in the Morea. While otherwise reliable, the Aragonese version is considered erroneous in this regard.

Guy's tenure as a baron is relatively obscure. In 1280, he is known to have enlarged the barony by acquiring neighbouring lands such as parts of the Lisarea or the fief of Mitopoli. In November 1282, Guy was named bailli of the Principality for the King of Naples instead of Narjot de Toucy, whose duties as Admiral of the kingdom did not allow him to take up the post. Guy held the position until 1285, when he was replaced by the Duke of Athens, William I de la Roche. Guy died shortly after, either in late 1285 or in early 1286, leaving his barony to an unnamed daughter, who married George I Ghisi, heir to Tinos and Mykonos.

References

Sources
 
 

13th-century births
1280s deaths
13th-century rulers in Europe
Baillis of the Principality of Achaea
Guy
13th-century people from the Principality of Achaea
Year of birth unknown